"I've Told Ev'ry Little Star" is a popular song with music by Jerome Kern and lyrics by Oscar Hammerstein II, published in 1932.  The song was introduced in the musical Music in the Air. The first hit recording of the song was released in 1932 by Jack Denny and His Waldorf-Astoria Orchestra, featuring the vocals of Paul Small. It has since been recorded and sampled by many artists, including Mac Miller on the track "Knock Knock" from his 2010 mixtape K.I.D.S..

Linda Scott version

The best-known recording is the 1961 hit by Linda Scott, titled "I've Told Every Little Star", which reached No. 3 on the United States' Billboard Hot 100 chart. Scott's version reached No. 1 in the Philippines, South Africa, and Sweden. Scott's version also reached No. 1 in Denmark, in a tandem ranking with Gitte Hænning's version.

The single was ranked No. 33 on Cash Boxs "Top 100 Chart Hits of 1961" and No. 74 on Billboards "Hot 100 for 1961 – Top Sides of the Year".

Chart performance

In popular culture
In an audition scene in the film Mulholland Drive, the Linda Scott recording was lip-synched to by an auditioning actress Camilla Rhodes (Melissa George); a character who bears some resemblance to Linda Scott herself. The Linda Scott version also features as the title song of The Girl (2012) and as the opening theme for Japanese television personality Matsuko Deluxe's program Matsuko no Shiranai Sekai. This version was sampled by rapper Mac Miller on "Knock Knock", which appeared on his 2010 mixtape K.I.D.S.. The opening theme for the 1992 television series Billy featured a version of the song performed by Sonny Rollins, created especially for the series.

Gitte Hænning version
Danish singer Gitte Hænning released a version of the song in 1961. Her version reached No. 1 in Denmark, in a tandem ranking with Linda Scott's version, while reaching the top 5 Finland, and No. 9 in Sweden.

Chart performance

Recorded versions

Cannonball Adderley (1959)
Jamey Aebersold
Jessica Andersson
Michael Ballam
Stanley Black
Pat Boone
Jacob Collier
Ray Conniff
Country Girls – "Ranrarun ~Anata ni Muchuu~" (2016)
Bing Crosby (recorded December 31, 1945 and included in the album Bing Crosby – Jerome Kern)  
Jack Denny and His Waldorf-Astoria Orchestra (1932)
Kenny Drew
Drifters (Sweden)
Eddy Duchin
Irene Dunne
Mary Ellis (1933)
Percy Faith
Ferrante & Teicher
George Feyer
Henry Hall & the BBC Dance Orchestra
Gitte Hænning (1961)
Peggy King
Dorothy Kirsten
Mario Lanza
London Philharmonic Orchestra
Dave McKenna
Marian McPartland – At The Hickory House (2009)
Marion Marlowe
Brad Mehldau
Misha Mengelberg
Joan Morris
Sonny Rollins
Annie Ross – Annie By Candlelight / Nocturne For Vocalists (1956)
Jonathan Schwartz
Linda Scott (1961)
Margaret Whiting
Hugo Winterhalter
Kim Davey

References 

Songs with music by Jerome Kern
Songs with lyrics by Oscar Hammerstein II
1932 songs
1961 singles
Linda Scott songs
Drifters (Swedish band) songs
Jessica Andersson songs
Canadian-American Records singles
Number-one singles in Denmark
Number-one singles in South Africa
Number-one singles in Sweden
Irene Dunne songs